Woody Harris (November 1, 1911 – February 19, 1985) was an American songwriter of the 1950s and 1960s. He is perhaps best known for songs written for and with Bobby Darin. On "Queen of the Hop", Darin used the name "Walden Tweed".  Darin's real name was Walden Robert Cassotto. He also wrote songs for Elvis Presley, Della Reese and other popular singers. In addition to his collaboration with Darin, he also collaborated  with Eddie V. Deane, Jack Reardon, and others. Harris composed songs in the rock and roll, rockabilly, and blues genres.

Personal life
Harris was born November 1, 1911, in New York City. He died February 19, 1985, in Hallandale, Florida.

Songs
Below is a partial list of songs written by Harris:

Footnotes

See also
:Category:Songs written by Woody Harris

1911 births
1985 deaths
American rock songwriters
American male songwriters
Musicians from New York City
Songwriters from New York (state)
People from Hallandale Beach, Florida
20th-century American composers
20th-century American male musicians